Mount Byrd is a mountain,  high, located  north of the eastern end of Asman Ridge in the Sarnoff Mountains, Ford Ranges, Marie Byrd Land, Antarctica. It was mapped by the United States Antarctic Service (1939–41) led by R. Admiral Richard E. Byrd, and named by the Advisory Committee on Antarctic Names (US-ACAN) for Richard E. Byrd, Jr., son of Admiral Byrd and a member of Operation Highjump (1946–47), who was of assistance to US-ACAN in clarifying a large number of name suggestions put forth by his father.

References
 

Mountains of Marie Byrd Land